Arthrosphaera versicolor, is a species of pill millipedes in the family Arthrosphaeridae. It is endemic to Sri Lanka.

References

Sphaerotheriida
Millipedes of Asia
Endemic fauna of Sri Lanka
Animals described in 1859